The Veleka is a river in the very southeast of Bulgaria (Burgas Province), as well as the very northeast of European Turkey. It is 147 km long, of which 108 km lies in Bulgaria and 25 km lie in Turkey, and has its sources from a number of Karst springs in the Turkish part of the Strandzha (İstranca) mountains. It flows into the Black Sea at the Bulgarian village of Sinemorets. Veleka is situated in Strandzha Nature Park.

The river's width near the mouth is from 8 to 10 m and its depth ranges from 2 to 4 m. At its mouth, the Veleka is 50 m wide and 7 to 8 m deep, overflowing shortly before making a turn and pouring into the sea.

The waters of the Veleka are rich in flora and fauna, with more than 30 species of freshwater fish present, the most frequent one being the chub. Five endangered animal species inhabit the river, as well as important regional plants.

Namesakes
Veleka Ridge on Livingston Island in the South Shetland Islands, Antarctica is named after Veleka River.

References

Rivers of Bulgaria
Rivers of Turkey
Landforms of Burgas Province
Strandzha
International rivers of Europe
Tributaries of the Black Sea